This article presents the national team appearances in the men's Olympic water polo tournament since the inaugural official edition in 1900.

As of the 2020 Summer Olympics, 52 men's national water polo teams from six continents have competed at the Olympic Games. European teams have won all 27 official tournaments. The inaugural winners in 1900 were Great Britain; the current champions are Serbia. The most successful team is currently Hungary men's team, who has won the Olympic title on nine occasions.

Abbreviations

Team statistics

Comprehensive team results by tournament

Debut of teams
Last updated: 27 July 2021.

Legend
 Team* – Host team
 Team† – Defunct team

Number of appearances by team

Results of host teams
Last updated: 8 August 2021.

Legend and abbreviation
 Year* – As host team
 Team† – Defunct team
 Finish‡ – It is the best performance of the team
 Apps – Appearances

Results of defending champions and runners-up
Last updated: 8 August 2021.

Legend
 Team* – Host team
 Team† – Defunct team

Best finishes by team

Finishes in the top four

Medal table

Longest active appearance droughts
The following table is pre-sorted by number of Olympic tournaments missed (in descending order), year of the last appearance (in ascending order), name of the team (in ascending order), respectively. Last updated: 8 August 2021.

Notes:
 Does not include teams that have not yet made their first appearance at the Olympics or teams that no longer exist.
 With the exception of 1916, 1940 and 1944, does not include droughts when the Olympic tournament was not held due to World War I and II.

Legend
 Year* – As host team

Longest appearance droughts overall
The following table is pre-sorted by number of Olympic tournaments missed (in descending order), year of the previous appearance (in ascending order), name of the team (in ascending order), respectively. Last updated: 8 August 2021.

Notes:
 Only includes droughts begun after a team's first appearance and until the team ceased to exist.
 With the exception of 1916, 1940 and 1944, does not include droughts when the Olympic tournament was not held due to World War I and II.

Legend
 Year* – As host team
 Team† – Defunct team

Team records
Teams having equal quantities in the tables below are ordered by the tournament the quantity was attained in (the teams that attained the quantity first are listed first). If the quantity was attained by more than one team in the same tournament, these teams are ordered alphabetically. Last updated: 8 August 2021.

Legend
 Year* – As host team
 Team† – Defunct team

Appearances
 Most appearances 23, Hungary (1912, 1924, 1928, 1932, 1936, 1948, 1952, 1956, 1960, 1964, 1968, 1972, 1976, 1980, 1988, 1992, 1996, 2000, 2004, 2008, 2012, 2016, 2020).
 Most appearances, never winning a title 21, United States (1920, 1924, 1928, 1932*, 1936, 1948, 1952, 1956, 1960, 1964, 1968, 1972, 1984*, 1988, 1992, 1996*, 2000, 2004, 2008, 2012, 2016).
 Most appearances, never finishing in the top two 17, Netherlands (1908, 1920, 1924, 1928*, 1936, 1948, 1952, 1960, 1964, 1968, 1972, 1976, 1980, 1984, 1992, 1996, 2000).
 Most appearances, never winning a medal 16, Australia (1948, 1952, 1956*, 1960, 1964, 1972, 1976, 1980, 1984, 1988, 1992, 2000*, 2004, 2008, 2012, 2016).
 Most appearances, never finishing in the top four 16, Australia (1948, 1952, 1956*, 1960, 1964, 1972, 1976, 1980, 1984, 1988, 1992, 2000*, 2004, 2008, 2012, 2016).
 Fewest appearances 1, Luxembourg (1928), Iceland (1936), Chile (1948), Portugal (1952), Singapore (1956), East Germany† (1968), Iran (1976), South Korea (1988*), Unified Team† (1992), Ukraine (1996), Slovakia (2000), Serbia and Montenegro† (2004).
 Fewest appearances, winning a title 4, Serbia (2008, 2012, 2016, 2020).
 Fewest appearances, finishing in the top two 1, Serbia and Montenegro† (2004).
 Fewest appearances, finishing in the top two, active team 3, Russia (1996, 2000, 2004).
 Fewest appearances, winning a medal 1, Unified Team† (1992), Serbia and Montenegro† (2004).
 Fewest appearances, winning a medal, active team 3, Russia (1996, 2000, 2004).
 Fewest appearances, finishing in the top four 1, Unified Team† (1992), Serbia and Montenegro† (2004).
 Fewest appearances, finishing in the top four, active team 3, Austria (1912, 1936, 1952), Russia (1996, 2000, 2004).

Top four
 Most titles won 9, Hungary (1932, 1936, 1952, 1956, 1964, 1976, 2000, 2004, 2008).
 Most second-place finishes 4, Belgium (1900, 1908, 1920*, 1924), Yugoslavia† (1952, 1956, 1964, 1980).
 Most third-place finishes 4, Hungary (1960, 1968, 1980, 2020).
 Most fourth-place finishes 4, Spain (1980, 1984, 2000, 2020).
 Most finishes in the top two 12, Hungary (1928, 1932, 1936, 1948, 1952, 1956, 1964, 1972, 1976, 2000, 2004, 2008).
 Most finishes in the top two, never winning a title 4, Belgium (1900, 1908, 1920*, 1924).
 Most finishes in the top three 16, Hungary (1928, 1932, 1936, 1948, 1952, 1956, 1960, 1964, 1968, 1972, 1976, 1980, 2000, 2004, 2008, 2020).
 Most finishes in the top three, never winning a title 6, Belgium (1900, 1908, 1912, 1920*, 1924, 1936), United States (1924, 1932, 1972, 1984, 1988, 2008).
 Most finishes in the top three, never finishing in the top two 2, Netherlands (1948, 1976).
 Most finishes in the top four 17, Hungary (1928, 1932, 1936, 1948, 1952, 1956, 1960, 1964, 1968, 1972, 1976, 1980, 1996, 2000, 2004, 2008, 2020).
 Most finishes in the top four, never winning a title 9, United States (1920, 1924, 1932*, 1952, 1972, 1984*, 1988, 1992, 2008).
 Most finishes in the top four, never finishing in the top two 3, Netherlands (1908, 1948, 1976), West Germany† (1972*, 1984, 1988), Montenegro (2008, 2012, 2016).
 Most finishes in the top four, never winning a medal 3, Montenegro (2008, 2012, 2016).
 Fewest finishes in the top two, winning a title 1, France (1924*).
 Fewest finishes in the top three, winning a title 2, Spain (1992*, 1996).
 Fewest finishes in the top three, finishing in the top two 1, Serbia and Montenegro† (2004), Greece (2020).
 Fewest finishes in the top four, winning a title 3, Germany (1928, 1932, 1936*), Croatia (1996, 2012, 2016).
 Fewest finishes in the top four, finishing in the top two 1, Serbia and Montenegro† (2004).
 Fewest finishes in the top four, finishing in the top two, active team 2, Russia (2000, 2004), Greece (2004, 2020).
 Fewest finishes in the top four, winning a medal 1, Unified Team† (1992), FR Yugoslavia† (2000), Serbia and Montenegro† (2004).
 Fewest finishes in the top four, winning a medal, active team 2, Russia (2000, 2004), Greece (2004, 2020).

Consecutive
 Most consecutive titles won 3, Great Britain (1908*–1912–1920), Hungary (2000–2004–2008).
 Most consecutive second-place finishes 2, Belgium (1920*–1924), Germany (1932–1936*), Yugoslavia† (1952–1956), United States (1984*–1988).
 Most consecutive third-place finishes 2, Serbia (2008–2012).
 Most consecutive fourth-place finishes 3, Montenegro (2008–2012–2016).
 Most consecutive finishes in the top two 6, Hungary (1928–1932–1936–1948–1952–1956).
 Most consecutive finishes in the top three 12, Hungary (1928–1932–1936–1948–1952–1956–1960–1964–1968–1972–1976–1980).
 Most consecutive finishes in the top four 12, Hungary (1928–1932–1936–1948–1952–1956–1960–1964–1968–1972–1976–1980).
 Most consecutive appearances 19, Italy (1948–1952–1956–1960*–1964–1968–1972–1976–1980–1984–1988–1992–1996–2000–2004–2008–2012–2016–2020).
 Biggest improvement in position in consecutive tournaments Did not participate/qualify, then won the title, Germany (1924–1928), Italy (1936–1948).

Gaps
 Longest gap between successive titles 24 years, Hungary (1976–2000).
 Longest gap between successive second-place finishes 36 years, Italy (1976–2012).
 Longest gap between successive third-place finishes 44 years, Italy (1952–1996).
 Longest gap between successive fourth-place finishes 40 years, United States (1952–1992).
 Longest gap between successive appearances in the top two 24 years, Hungary (1976–2000).
 Longest gap between successive appearances in the top three 40 years, United States (1932*–1972).
 Longest gap between successive appearances in the top four 40 years, Netherlands (1908–1948).
 Longest gap between successive appearances 61 years, South Africa (1960–2020).

Debuting teams
 Best finish by a debuting team Champions, Great Britain (1900).
 Best finish by a debuting team after 1900 Runners-up, Croatia (1996), Serbia and Montenegro† (2004).
 Worst finish by a debuting team 20th position, Portugal (1952).
 Worst finish by a debuting team after 1972 12th position (last position), Iran (1976), South Korea (1988*), Ukraine (1996), Slovakia (2000).

Host teams
 Best finish by host team Champions, Great Britain (1908*), France (1924*), Italy (1960*), Soviet Union† (1980*).
 Worst finish by host team Did not participate/qualify, Finland (1952*).
 Worst finish by host team that participates in the tournament 13th position, Great Britain (1948*).
 Worst finish by host team that participates in the tournament after 1972 12th position (last position), South Korea (1988*), China (2008*), Great Britain (2012*).
 Best finish by last host team Champions, Great Britain (1912), Spain (1996).
 Worst finish by last host team Did not participate/qualify, Netherlands (1932), Germany (1948), Canada (1980), Soviet Union† (1984, withdrew), South Korea (1992), China (2012), Great Britain (2016), Brazil (2020).
 Worst finish by last host team that participates in the tournament 15th position, Australia (1960).
 Worst finish by last host team that participates in the tournament after 1972 9th position, Australia (2004).
 Had its best performance as hosts Champions, Great Britain (1908*), France (1924*), Italy (1960*), Soviet Union† (1980*).Runners-up, Sweden (1912*), Belgium (1920*), United States (1984*).9th position, Canada (1976*).12th position, South Korea (1988*).
 Had its worst performance as hosts 12th position, South Korea (1988*), China (2008*).13th position, Great Britain (1948*).
 Had its worst performance as hosts after 1972 12th position (last position), South Korea (1988*), China (2008*), Great Britain (2012*).

Defending champions
 Best finish by defending champions Champions, Great Britain (1912, 1920), Hungary (1936, 1956, 2004, 2008), Yugoslavia† (1988), Serbia (2020).
 Worst finish by defending champions Did not participate/qualify, Soviet Union† (1984, withdrew), Yugoslavia† (1992, defunct).
 Worst finish by defending champions that participates in the next tournament 8th position, Great Britain (1924), Soviet Union† (1976).

Defending runners-up
 Best finish by defending runners-up Champions, Hungary (1932, 1952, 1976), Soviet Union† (1972), Spain (1996), Yugoslavia† (1968, 1984).
 Worst finish by defending runners-up Did not participate/qualify, Germany (1948), Serbia and Montenegro† (2008, defunct).
 Worst finish by defending runners-up that participates in the next tournament 8th position, Italy (1980), United States (2012).

Population
 Most populated country, participant China (2008*), 1,324,655,000 (source)
 Least populated country, participant Iceland (1928), 104,000 (source)
 Least populated country, participant, after 1972 Montenegro (2008), 616,000 (source)
 Most populated country, hosts China (2008*), 1,324,655,000 (source)
 Least populated country, hosts Finland (1952*), 4,090,000 (source)
 Most populated country, champions Soviet Union† (1980*), more than 260,000,000 (source)
 Least populated country, champions Croatia (2012), 4,267,000 (source)
 Most populated country, runners-up United States (2008), 304,375,000 (source)
 Least populated country, runners-up Croatia (1996), 4,516,000 (source)
 Most populated country, third place Unified Team† (1992), more than 280,000,000 (source)
 Least populated country, third place Sweden (1908), 5,404,000 (source)
 Most populated country, fourth place United States (1992), 256,514,000 (source)
 Least populated country, fourth place Montenegro (2008), 616,000 (source)

Confederation statistics

Number of teams by confederation
This is a summary of the total number of participating teams by confederation in each tournament. Last updated: 7 August 2021.

Legend
  – Forthcoming tournament

Best performances by tournament

All-time best performances

See also
 Water polo at the Summer Olympics

 Lists of Olympic water polo records and statistics
 List of men's Olympic water polo tournament records and statistics
 List of women's Olympic water polo tournament records and statistics
 List of Olympic champions in men's water polo
 List of Olympic champions in women's water polo
 National team appearances in the women's Olympic water polo tournament
 List of players who have appeared in multiple men's Olympic water polo tournaments
 List of players who have appeared in multiple women's Olympic water polo tournaments
 List of Olympic medalists in water polo (men)
 List of Olympic medalists in water polo (women)
 List of men's Olympic water polo tournament top goalscorers
 List of women's Olympic water polo tournament top goalscorers
 List of men's Olympic water polo tournament goalkeepers
 List of women's Olympic water polo tournament goalkeepers
 List of Olympic venues in water polo

 FINA Water Polo World Rankings
 List of water polo world medalists
 Major achievements in water polo by nation

Notes

References

Sources

External links
 Olympic water polo – Official website

National teams, Men